Peter Mörk is a retired Swedish footballer. Mörk made 26 Allsvenskan appearances for Djurgården and scored six goals.

References

Swedish footballers
Djurgårdens IF Fotboll players
Association footballers not categorized by position